Pink Gods is a lost 1922 American silent melodrama film produced by Famous Players-Lasky and distributed by Paramount Pictures. It was directed by Penrhyn Stanlaws and starred Bebe Daniels and Adolphe Menjou. The source for the film scenario was the short story Pink Gods and Blue Demons by Cynthia Stockley.

The film was released the same day as Manslaughter in which Pink Gods cast members Raymond Hatton and Guy Oliver also appear.

Cast
Bebe Daniels as Lorraine Temple
James Kirkwood as John Quelch
Anna Q. Nilsson as Lady Margot Cork
Raymond Hatton as Jim Wingate
Adolphe Menjou as Louis Barney
Guy Oliver as Mark Escher
George Cowl as Colonel Pat Temple
Arthur Trimble as Dick Cork

References

External links

 

Lantern slide(Wayback archived version)

1922 films
American silent feature films
Lost American films
Paramount Pictures films
Films based on short fiction
1922 drama films
Silent American drama films
Films with screenplays by Sonya Levien
American black-and-white films
Melodrama films
1922 lost films
Lost drama films
Films directed by Penrhyn Stanlaws
1920s American films
1920s English-language films